"" is the national anthem of Belgium. The originally French title refers to Brabant; the name is usually maintained untranslated in Belgium's other two official languages, Dutch and German.

History 

According to legend, the Belgian national anthem was written in September 1830, during the Belgian Revolution, by a young revolutionary called "Jenneval", who read the lyrics during a meeting at the Aigle d'Or café.

Jenneval, a Frenchman whose real name was Alexandre Dechet (sometimes known as Louis-Alexandre Dechet), did in fact write the Brabançonne.  At the time, he was an actor at the theatre where, in August 1830, the revolution started which led to independence from the Netherlands.  Jenneval died in the war of independence. François van Campenhout composed the accompanying score, based on the tune of a French song called "L'Air des lanciers polonais" ("the tune of the Polish Lancers"), written by the French poet Eugène de Pradel, whose tune was itself an adaptation of the tune of a song, "L'Air du magistrat irréprochable", found in a popular collection of drinking songs called La Clé du caveau (The Key to the cellar) and it was first performed in September 1830.

In 1860, Belgium formally adopted the song and music as its national anthem, although the then prime minister, Charles Rogier edited out lyrics attacking the Dutch Prince of Orange.

The Brabançonne is also a monument (1930) by the sculptor Charles Samuel on the Surlet de Chokier square in Brussels. The monument contains partial lyrics of both the French and Dutch versions of the anthem. Like many elements in Belgian folklore, this is mainly based on the French "La Marseillaise" which is also both an anthem and the name of a monument – the sculptural group Departure of the Volunteers of 1792, commonly called La Marseillaise, at the base of the Arc de Triomphe in Paris.

Lyrics

1830 original lyrics

First version (August 1830)

Second version (September 1830)

Third version (1860)

Current version 
Various committees were charged with reviewing the text and tune of the Brabançonne and establishing an official version. A ministerial circular of the Ministry of the Interior on 8 August 1921 decreed that only the fourth verse of the text by Charles Rogier should be considered official for all three, French, German and in Dutch. Here below:

Modern short trilingual version 
In recent years, an unofficial short version of the anthem is sung during Belgian National Day on 21 July each year, combining the words of the anthem in all three of Belgium's official languages, similar to the bilingual version of "O Canada". The lyrics are from the 4th verse of the anthem.

2007 Yves Leterme incident
On the 2007 Belgian national day (21 July), Flemish politician Yves Leterme, who would become Prime Minister two years later, was asked by a French-speaking reporter if he also knew the French lyrics of the Belgian national anthem, whereupon he began to sing La Marseillaise, the French national anthem, instead of La Brabançonne. The lyrics are not taught in Belgian schools and many people do not know them. In 2018, the Minister of Education of Wallonia and Brussels proposed to make it mandatory for students to be taught the lyrics at school.

See also 

 "De Vlaamse Leeuw"
 "Le Chant des Wallons"
 Place des Martyrs, Brussels
 "Vers l'avenir"

Notes

References

External links 

 Belgium: La Brabançonne – Audio of the national anthem of Belgium, with information and lyrics (archive link)
 Les Arquebusiers History, versions (text and audio) and illustrations
  Belgium National Anthem instrumental File MIDI (5ko)
  Belgium National Anthem instrumental (better) File AU (570ko)
 ; Helmut Lotti, in French, Dutch and German, before King Albert II

Belgian anthems
French-language Belgian songs
Dutch-language Belgian songs
Belgian patriotic songs
National symbols of Belgium
Belgian Revolution
1830 songs
National anthems
European anthems
National anthem compositions in B-flat major